Randhir Singh Kapriwas is a former member of the Haryana Legislative Assembly from the Bharatiya Janata Party representing the Rewari constituency in Rewari district of Haryana.

References 

People from Rewari district
Bharatiya Janata Party politicians from Haryana
Living people
Haryana MLAs 2014–2019
1946 births